Agrionoptera is a genus of dragonflies in the family Libellulidae.
Species of Agrionoptera are found across India, Southeast Asia and the Pacific.

Species
The genus Agrionoptera includes the following species:
Agrionoptera bartola 
Agrionoptera cardinalis 
Agrionoptera insignis  – red swampdragon
subspecies Agrionoptera insignis allogenes  – red swampdragon
Agrionoptera longitudinalis 
subspecies Agrionoptera longitudinalis biserialis  – striped swampdragon

Agrionoptera sanguinolenta 
Agrionoptera sexlineata

References

Libellulidae
Anisoptera genera
Odonata of Asia
Odonata of Australia
Odonata of Oceania
Taxa named by Friedrich Moritz Brauer